Anatoly Nikolayevich Amelin is a former international table tennis player from the Soviet Union.

Table tennis career
He won three World Championship medals at the World Table Tennis Championships. A mixed doubles bronze medal with Zoja Rudnova and a silver medal and bronze with Stanislav Gomozkov in the men's doubles.

He also won an English Open title.

Personal life
He married fellow table tennis international Laima Balaišytė.

See also
 List of World Table Tennis Championships medalists

References

Soviet table tennis players
1946 births
Living people
Place of birth missing (living people)
World Table Tennis Championships medalists